This list of Russian weaponry makers includes the famous weaponry inventors and engineers of the Tsardom of Russia, Russian Empire, the Soviet Union and the Russian Federation.

Alphabetical list


A
Nikolay Afanasiev, developer of TKB-011 2M bullpup assault rifle

C
Andrey Chokhov, maker of the Tsar Cannon, the world's largest bombard by caliber

D
Vasily Degtyaryov, designer of Degtyaryov-series firearms, co-developer of Fedorov Avtomat, inventor of self-loading carbine
Yevgeny Dragunov, designer of the Dragunov sniper rifle

F
Ivan Fyodorov, 16th century inventor of multibarreled mortar, introduced printing to Russia
Vladimir Fyodorov, one of the chief pioneers of the battle rifle (Fedorov Avtomat) and general-purpose machine gun.

G

Arcadiy Georgievich Shipunov, one of the designers of GSh-18
Leonid Gobyato, inventor of modern mortar
Vasiliy Grabin, designer of the ZiS-2 anti-tank gun, the best of World War II and one of the most produced in history

K
Mikhail Kalashnikov,  inventor of AK-47 and AK-74 assault rifles, world's most popular (produced more than all other types of assault rifles combined) 
Yuly Khariton, chief designer of the Soviet atomic bomb, co-developer of the Tsar Bomb
Nikolai Kibalchich, pioneer of rocketry. The International Astronomical Union honoured the rocketry pioneer by naming a crater on the moon Kibal'chich.
German Korobov, inventor of the TKB-022PM and TKB-059 bullpup assault rifles.
Sergei Korolyov, inventor of the soviet unions intercontinental ballistic missile (R-7 Semyorka)
Mikhail Koshkin, designer of T-34 medium tank, the most produced tank of World War II

L
Semyon Lavochkin, designer of the La-series aircraft and the first operational surface-to-air missile S-25 Berkut
Nikolai Lebedenko, designer of the Tsar Tank, the largest armoured vehicle in history
Dmitry Lebedev, designer of the PL-15

M
Nikolay Makarov, designed the Makarov pistol, the Soviet Union's standard military side arm from 1951 to 1991
Victor Makeev, inventor of the Soviet Unions submarine-launched ballistic missile
Nestor Makhno, anarchist, legendary inventor of tachanka
Alexander Morozov, designer of T-54/55 (the most produced tank in history), co-developer of T-34
Sergey Mosin, inventor of the Mosin–Nagant rifle, one of the most produced in history to this day

N
Alexander Nadiradze, creator of the Soviet Unions first mobile ICBM (RT-21 Temp 2S) and the Soviet Union's first reliable mobile ICBM RT-2PM Topol
Andrey Nartov, polymath inventor, designed quick-firing battery and cannon telescopic sight
Sergey Nepobedimy, designed the first supersonic anti-tank guided missile Sturm and other Soviet rocket weaponry
Gennadiy Nikonov, inventor of the AN-94 assault rifle with the "straight-back bolt" scheme

P
Gryazev Vasily Petrovich, one of the designers of GSh-18
Nikolay Popov, designed the first operational gas turbine tank T-80
Aleksandr Porokhovschikov, inventor of Vezdekhod (Russias first prototype continuous track tank, or tankette, and the first Russian continuous track amphibious ATV)

S
Andrei Sakharov, physicist, inventor of explosively pumped flux compression generator, co-developer of the Tsar Bomb, Nobel Peace Prize winner
Pavel Schilling, inventor of Russias electric mine
Piotr Serdyukov, designer of the SR-1 Vektor 
Vyacheslav Silin, designer of the Silin machine gun
Georgi Shpagin, designer of the PPSh-41 submachine gun
Boris Shavyrin, inventor of air-augmented rocket
Pyotr Shuvalov, founder of Izhevsk, inventor of canister shot mortar, introduced the unicorne mortar
Sergei Simonov, designer of the SKS carbine, and AO-31 and AG-043 assault rifles
Vladimir Simonov, inventor of underwater assault rifle and AO-63 assault rifle
Alexey Sudayev, designer of the PPS submachine gun

T
Peter Tkachev, inventor of the Balanced Automatic Recoil System and designer of the TsNIITochMash AO-63 assault rifle
Fedor Tokarev, designer of TT-33 handgun and SVT-40 self-loading rifle,  Soviet weapons used in World War II

U
Vladimir Utkin, designer of the railcar-launched ICBM (RT-23 Molodets)

V
Ivan Vyrodkov, creator of Russia's battery-tower

Y
Vladimir Yarygin, designer of the MP-443 Grach

See also
List of Russian weaponry
List of Russian inventors
List of Russian inventions
Defence industry of Russia

References

Firearm designers
Russian engineers
Weapons of Russia
Military industry
Weaponry makers
Russian and Soviet military-related lists